Couridjah railway station is a heritage-listed disused railway station located on the Picton – Mittagong loop railway line in the south-western Sydney settlement of Couridjah in the Wollondilly Shire local government area of New South Wales, Australia. The property was added to the New South Wales State Heritage Register on 2 April 1999.

History
The station opened on 2 December 1867 as Picton Lagoons Tank, was renamed Lagoons in 1878, Picton Lakes on 21 April 1879 and finally Couridjah on 1 January 1929. The station along with the Loop Line was closed in 1978.

The station has been restored by volunteers from the NSW Rail Museum in Thirlmere. Occasionally, the museum operates steam heritage trains on the line through the station, between Thirlmere, Picton and Buxton.

Description 
The complex comprises a type 9 timber waiting shed non-standard bracketed building that is used the railway station building, erected in 1867; a platform face and platform surface.

Heritage listing 
Couridjah station building is a rare non-standard timber building from early in the development of the railway (1867), there being one other similar building at Raglan, and is of high significance, even though a modest building.

Couridjah railway station was listed on the New South Wales State Heritage Register on 2 April 1999 having satisfied the following criteria.

The place possesses uncommon, rare or endangered aspects of the cultural or natural history of New South Wales.

This item is assessed as historically and socially rare. This item is assessed as arch. rare.

See also 

List of disused railway stations in New South Wales

References

Attribution 

Disused regional railway stations in New South Wales
Railway stations in Australia opened in 1867
Railway stations closed in 1978
New South Wales State Heritage Register
Articles incorporating text from the New South Wales State Heritage Register
Main Southern railway line, New South Wales
Wollondilly Shire